Mount Burrill is a mountain,  high, on the eastern edge of Malta Plateau, situated  south of Mount Hussey at the head of Hand Glacier, in the Victory Mountains of Victoria Land. It was named by the New Zealand Antarctic Place-Names Committee for Dr. Meredith F. Burrill, Executive Secretary of the U.S. Board on Geographic Names, 1943–73. His leadership in the development of Antarctic names policy and principles has been instrumental in establishing greater international uniformity in the geographic nomenclature of the continent.

References 

Mountains of Victoria Land
Borchgrevink Coast